Werauhia brunei is a plant species in the genus Werauhia. This species is endemic to Costa Rica.

References

brunei
Endemic flora of Costa Rica